Paul Sheehan (born 26 January 1977) is an Australian professional golfer.

Sheehan plays mainly on the PGA Tour of Australasia and the Japan Golf Tour. He has featured in the top 100 of the Official World Golf Ranking. He has three wins in Japan, including the 2006 Japan Open, and one win in Australia. He has also played on the PGA Tour. He lives in Melbourne and plays at the Victoria Golf Club as a member. 

Sheehan finished 20th on the Nationwide Tour money list in 2006, giving him his first start on the PGA Tour.

As a child, Sheehan was a junior tennis champion, then took up golf at age 13 and at 16 broke par. He joined the PGA Tour of Australasia in 1999 and has played consistently on his home tour ever since.

Professional wins (8)

Japan Golf Tour wins (3)

 The Japan Open Golf Championship is also a Japan major championship.

Japan Golf Tour playoff record (0–1)

PGA Tour of Australasia wins (2)

1Co-sanctioned by the Nationwide Tour

PGA Tour of Australasia playoff record (1–0)

Japan Challenge Tour wins (2)

Australasian Development Tour wins (1)

Results in major championships

Note: Sheehan never played in the Masters Tournament or the PGA Championship.

CUT = missed the half-way cut

Results in World Golf Championships

"T" = Tied

Team appearances
Amateur
Australian Men's Interstate Teams Matches (representing New South Wales): 1996 (winners), 1997, 1998 (winners), 1999

See also
2006 Nationwide Tour graduates

References

External links

Australian male golfers
Japan Golf Tour golfers
PGA Tour of Australasia golfers
PGA Tour golfers
Korn Ferry Tour graduates
Sportspeople from Wollongong
1977 births
Living people